Matt Tilley (born 4 March 1969 in Melbourne) is an Australian ex-radio presenter and stand-up comedian.

Personal life

Tilley was raised in Mount Eliza. He completed his secondary school education in 1986 at The Peninsula School in Mount Eliza. He completed a Bachelor of Laws degree from Monash University, taking 11 years to complete the degree, and a Diploma in Not-For-Profit Governance. He began stand-up comedy in 1987. He is married and has three children. He is an avid produce grower, food-waste fighter, and compassionate storyteller.

Career

Radio
 FOX FM – Morning Crew
 FOX FM – Vernon All Request
 FOX FM – Hedgeburners
 FOX FM – Tramspotters (1997)
 FOX FM – Tracy & Matt in the Morning (1997–2003) with Tracy Bartram.
 FOX FM – The Matt & Jo Show (2004–2013)
 Triple M – The One Percenters with Joe Hildebrand (2014)
 KIIS 101.1 – Matt & Jane with Jane Hall (2015)
Nova 100 – Matt Tilley in the Morning (2019)

"Gotcha" Calls
In early 2005, The Matt and Jo Show introduced a new segment which aired at 7:50 am titled "Matt Tilley's Gotcha Calls".  The segment features Tilley making prank phone calls. Triple M in Sydney also featured Tilley on The Grill Team where he presented "gotcha" calls on a regular basis.

Fox FM, in association with Michael Gudinski, released compilation albums of Tilley's gotcha calls, Cereal Pest: The Gotcha Calls. The album reached number twelve on the ARIA charts and was also nominated for ARIA Award for Best Comedy Release at the 2006 ARIA Awards.

The Gotcha Calls continued throughout 2006 and eventually spawned a two-disc CD sequel, Cereal Pest: Gotcha Calls – The Double Album, which was released a year later on 21 October 2006. The album reached number four on the ARIA charts.

A third double-CD Gotcha Call album, Cereal Pest: Gotcha Calls – Three's a Crowd, was released on 10 November 2007. The album reached number fourteen on the ARIA charts.

A fourth album, The Gotcha Calls – The Final Call, was released on 23 October 2009, and it reached number eight on the ARIA charts.

Television
 Ten Network – The Fugitive (2000)
 Nine Network – The Great Chase (2000)
 Seven Network – The Chat Room (2003)
 Fox Footy – The Greatest (2017)
Matt has also been featured as a performer on the Network Ten series Thank God You're Here and most recently co-hosted the failed Nine Network show Surprise Surprise Gotcha.

Post-media career
In 2020, Tilley joined Foodbank Victoria as their Chief Communications Officer.

Charitable work

The sales of Tilley's 2006 and 2007 albums raised a total of A$366,000: $160,000 for the Mercy Hospital for Women, Heidelberg, and $206,600 for the Royal Women's Hospital, Carlton. Proceeds of the third album went to community groups.

An avid runner, in September 2006, Tilley ran continuously on a treadmill for the duration of The Matt and Jo Show. Soliciting per-kilometre sponsorship for the Mental Illness Fellowship of Victoria, he raised $41,000.

In 2008, Tilley sought sponsorship for a run from the new FOX studios in Clarendon street in South Melbourne to Frankston, raising $91,500 for P.A.N.D.A. (the Post- and Antenatal Depression Association).

In 2011, Tilley raised $900 for the Royal Children's Hospital (RCH) through a segment that came about through his constant use of the saying "The thing is...".  An avid listener by the stage name of Professor Brent was required to listen between 6 and 9 am for the period of one week to count the number of times Tilley said "The thing is...".  For every time Tilley let one slip, he agreed to donate $100 to the RCH.

Scandal
In 2014, Tilley was involved in a scandal during a segment in the Triple M radio station owned by Southern Cross Austereo. Colombians in Australia through the Colombian consulate asked for a formal apology from Triple M for comments they considered offensive. An investigation was conducted by the Australian Communications and Media Authority which found that "although the stereotype is based on factual elements, the ACMA is satisfied that the segment mildly ridiculed the Colombian people, and that by inviting Colombian callers to comment on whether they had used cocaine, to some extent it encouraged the audience to share these feelings of ridicule." However, the Australian Communications and Media Authority found that "while the presenters explored a stereotype with the listeners, and were at times disrespectful of the Colombian people, any ridicule that was encouraged was not sufficient to reach the high threshold that is contemplated by the Codes." A full record of the investigation can be found in the Australian Communications and Media Authority website.

Discography

Albums

Awards and nominations

ARIA Music Awards
The ARIA Music Awards are a set of annual ceremonies presented by Australian Recording Industry Association (ARIA), which recognise excellence, innovation, and achievement across all genres of the music of Australia. They commenced in 1987.

! 
|-
| 2006 || Cereal Pest || rowspan="2"| ARIA Award for Best Comedy Release ||  || rowspan="2"|
|-
| 2008 || Cereal Pest: Gotcha Calls – Three's a Crowd ||  
|-

References 

Australian stand-up comedians
Comedians from Melbourne
Radio personalities from Melbourne
1969 births
Living people
Australian television presenters
Prank calling
Monash Law School alumni
People from Mount Eliza, Victoria